The Anglican Diocese of Kubwa is one of 13 within the Anglican Province of Abuja, itself one of 14 provinces within the Church of Nigeria. The current bishop is Duke Akamisoko.

Notes

Church of Nigeria dioceses
Dioceses of the Province of Abuja